The secretary of state of Maryland is charged with the administrative and record-keeping functions of the state government of the U.S. state of Maryland.  The secretary of state also holds custody of the Seal of Maryland.  Unlike in many states, the secretary of state is not an elective office, but is appointed by the governor and confirmed by the state senate. Susan C. Lee has served as the secretary of state since January 2023.

List of secretaries of state

References
 About the office of Secretary of State, from the Maryland Archives.
 List of Secretaries of State, from the Maryland Archives.

External links
 

1838 establishments in Maryland